The Litani River, the classical Leontes, is an important water resource in southern Lebanon. The river rises in the fertile Beqaa Valley, west of Baalbek, and empties into the Mediterranean Sea north of Tyre. Exceeding 140 km in length, the Litani River is the longest river in Lebanon and provides an average annual flow estimated at 920 million cubic meters. The waters of the Litani both originate and flow entirely within the borders of Lebanon. It provides a major source for water supply, irrigation and hydroelectricity both within Southern Lebanon, and the country as a whole.

Etymology
The Litani River is named after the Ugaritic deity Ltn (pronounced līyitānu), a seven-headed sea serpent and servant of the sea god Yam. The ī in the Lebanese name preserves the hypothesized ī in Ugaritic. The river that winds and coils like a serpent through the Beqaa Valley was believed to be the personification of the deity.

History
Historians in the past have claimed that the location of Biblical Misrephoth Maim, the place to which Joshua chased the various tribes after their defeat at the waters of Merom, was the river-mouth of the Litani River, but it is unlikely as the name Litani predates that of the Biblical story.

The Litani was a natural frontier that prevented the Seleucids from encroaching on the Ptolemaic dominion in the Levant.

Southern flow

After heading south parallel to the Syrian border, the course of the river bends dramatically westward. Near this bend, the Litani comes within five km of the Hasbani River.

Qasimiyeh
The portion of the river flowing west is called the Qasimiyeh. The Qasmieh-Ras-el-Aïn region, irrigated from the river's lower reaches from main irrigation canals, to south and north, is one of the largest irrigated areas in the nation, consisting of 32.64 km², shared among 1257 irrigating farmers, who concentrate on citrus crops and bananas (Raad 2004). In June 1941, the mouth of the river was the site of an attack by British commandos and Australian troops on Vichy French forces that became known as the Battle of the Litani River.

Litani River Dam

A spillway of 6503 meters carries the water to the underground station where generators produce a maximum of 185 megawatts of electricity, the largest hydroelectric project in Lebanon. The dam was intended eventually to provide irrigation for 310 km² of farmland in South Lebanon and 80 km² in the Beqaa Valley. The office is at the southern (dam) end of the lake on the left side. The lakeside has a hotel and a number of restaurants specializing in fresh trout.

The Litani River Authority 
The Litani River Authority was formed in 1954 to facilitate the integrated development of the Litani River Basin. Shortly after its formation, the authority engaged in a massive hydroelectric development project that tapped the 850 meter head potential between Lake Qaraoun and the Mediterranean. This development has brought about major hydrological changes to the Litani River Basin, where the flows from its upper reaches above Lake Qaraoun, referred to as the Upper Litani Basin, are diverted through a system of tunnels, ponds and plants, to meet the Mediterranean several kilometers north of its original natural tailwater. These changes have resulted in the effective hydrological separation between the Upper Litani Basin and the lower reaches. The advent of a protracted civil strife in the 1970s followed by a prolonged occupation in the 1980s that lasted into the 1990s, have plunged the country into disarray, freezing development and investment in infrastructure. The subsequent return to normal conditions has encouraged the river authority to initiate several major water diversion projects from the Upper Litani Basin worth hundreds of millions of US dollars.

Bridges over the Litani 
(Jisr means bridge in Arabic) 
 Jisr el Kasmieh (Leontes Bridge)
 Jisr el Akai 
 Jisr el Khardali 
 Jisr el Khatueh (Kakhieh) 
 Jisr el Burghuz 
 Jisr el Meshghara 
 Jisr el Karaoum

See also
 Battle of the Litani River (1941), during the Second World War, between Allied forces and Vichy French troops
 Operation Litani, 1978 Israeli invasion of Southern Lebanon

Citations

General and cited references 
 Ramadan, H. H., Beighley, R. E. and Ramamurthy, A. S. (2013). "Temperature and precipitation trends in Lebanon's largest river: the Litani Basin”, American Society of Civil Engineers, Journal of Water Resources Planning and Management, 139 (1), pp. 86–95. 
 Ramadan, H.H., Ramamurthy, A.S., and Beighley, R.E (2012). "Inter-annual temperature and precipitation variations over the Litani Basin in response to atmospheric circulation patterns”, Theoretical and Applied Climatology, Volume 108, Numbers 3-4 (2012), pp. 563–577. 
 Ramadan, H.H., Beighley R.E. and Ramamurthy A.S. (2012). "Modeling Streamflow Trends for a Watershed with Limited Data: A case on the Litani Basin, Lebanon” Hydrological Sciences Journal, 57 (8), pp. 1516–1529.
 Ramadan, H.H., Ramamurthy A.S. and Beighley R.E. (2013). "Sensitivity of the Litani Basin’s runoff in Lebanon to climate change.” International Journal of Environment and Pollution (in press).
 Bregman, Ahron (2002). Israel's Wars: A History Since 1947. London: Routledge. 
 Raad, Daoud, 2004. "Localized irrigation in Qasmieh-Ras-el-Aïn: a technique to be encouraged" pdf file
Amery, H. A. 1993. "The Litani River of Lebanon", Geographical Review 83 (3) pp229–237.
 Where the western Litani empties into the Mediterranean, on Wikimapia
 Old Feud Over Lebanese River Takes New Turn
 Assaf, Hamed and Saadeh, Mark. "Development of an Integrated Decision Support System for Water Quality Control in the Upper Litani Basin, Lebanon", Proceedings of the iEMSs Third Biennial Meeting, "Summit on Environmental Modelling and Software". International Environmental Modelling and Software Society, Burlington, USA, July 2006.

External links
 
 Lebanese minister: Litani river pollution a "national catastrophe" Archived

Rivers of Lebanon